The following are the football (soccer) events of the year 1909 throughout the world.

Events
Goalkeepers begin to wear a different coloured shirt to the rest of the team.

During the fall, a team composed of British players tour the United States.

19 December: Borussia Dortmund are founded.

Winners club national championship 
Germany: Phönix Karlsruhe
Greece: Peiraikos sindesmos Pireas
Italy: S.G. Pro Vercelli
Scotland: For fuller coverage, see 1908-09 in Scottish football.
Scottish Division One – Celtic
Scottish Division Two – Abercorn
Scottish Cup – After two drawn games between Celtic and Rangers and a riot the cup was withheld.

International tournaments
1909 British Home Championship (13 February – 3 April 1909)

Sir Thomas Lipton Trophy:
 West Auckland
 FC Winterthur
 Torino XI
 Stuttgarter Sportfreunde

Births
28 January – John Thomson, Scottish international footballer (died 1931)
26 September – Ştefan Dobay, Romanian international footballer (died 1994)
16 October – Franz Krumm, German international footballer (died 1943)

Deaths

Clubs founded
 Bologna FC 1909
 Borussia Dortmund
 Budapest Honvéd FC
 SK Sturm Graz

References 

 
Association football by year